Volobuev, Volobuiev, or Volobuyev is a surname, and may refer to:

Andrei Aleksandrovich Volobuyev (born 1984), Russian footballer
Anatoliy Volobuyev (born 1953), Ukrainian footballer
 Ivan Volobuiev (born 1991), Russian ice dancer
 Mykhailo Volobuiev (1903–1972), Ukrainian economist
 Pavel Volobuev (1923–1977), Azerbaijani historian
 Sergei Volobuyev (born 1972), Russian footballer

Russian-language surnames